Carlia sukur, the Sukur four-toed skink, is a species of skink in the genus Carlia. It is native to Indonesia.

References

Carlia
Reptiles described in 2014
Endemic fauna of Indonesia
Reptiles of Indonesia
Taxa named by George Robert Zug
Taxa named by Hinrich Kaiser